Dixie-Narco is an extended play (EP) by Scottish rock band Primal Scream, released on 27 January 1992 through Creation Records. Its lead track is "Movin' on Up", originally released on the Screamadelica album. This was the only official Primal Scream release to contain the song "Screamadelica" (which was recorded during sessions for the Screamadelica album) until the song appeared on the 20th anniversary edition of the Screamadelica album.

The remaining two tracks were recorded at Ardent Studios in Memphis during November 1991. 'Carry Me Home' was originally written by Dennis Wilson for The Beach Boys' 1973 album Holland, although it was not included on that album.

Track listing

The 7-inch and cassette formats omit "Stone My Soul". "Movin' on Up" previously appeared on Screamadelica.

Personnel
 "Movin' on Up" produced by Jimmy Miller
 "Stone My Soul", "Carry Me Home", and "Screamadelica" produced by Andrew Weatherall and Hugo Nicolson.
 "Screamadelica" features vocals from Denise Johnson and percussion by Paul Daley.

Charts

Dixie-Narco EP

"Movin' on Up"

References

1992 EPs
Creation Records EPs
Primal Scream albums